Moxy, also informally known as The Black Album or Moxy I, is the self-titled debut studio album by the Canadian hard rock and heavy metal band Moxy. Their independently produced album was released in 1975 by Polydor Records in Canada, then under Mercury Records label was reissued in 1976 for worldwide distribution, both labels were owned by PolyGram at the time (they are now owned by Universal Music Group).

The album was picked up by many radio stations in the United States and was one of the most requested albums in Texas. As a consequence, Moxy was picked up by the larger Mercury Records label in the US and a national distribution deal was made and the album was reissued in 1976. The album  produced the hit songs "Can't You See I'm a Star",  "Train",  "Out of the Darkness"  and with "Sail On Sail Away" and "Moon Rider" that are still in the 2000s (decade) on regular rotation on several rock radio stations in Texas.  The album sold well because of heavy promotion by the label who released the album on  8 Track in large numbers.

Tommy Bolin was a guest musician on the album. He had previously been the lead guitarist for the James Gang and would go on to replace Ritchie Blackmore in Deep Purple. Bolin does all but two guitar solos. Earl Johnson performed all rhythm guitar and the solos on "Sail On Sail Away", "Can't You See I'm A Star" and the ending of "Train". Johnson was supposed to do all the guitar parts, but got into a disagreement with the producer and was tossed out of the studio. Bolin, being nearby, was asked by Moxy's manager Roland Paquin to fill in for Johnson. Paquin knew Bolin from when he was road manager for the James Gang. Bolin was only in the studio for this album,  contrary to popular belief that he appears  on Moxy II. Though Bolin's time with Moxy was short, the album is popular with his fans. Bolin's tone and phrasing were very similar to his classic James Gang sound.

Buddy Caine, who is listed on the album cover, did not join the band until after the album was finished.  Caine was initially brought on board by the band as a rhythm guitarist to free up Johnson so he could play the solos on stage that Bolin had played in the studio.

Track listing 
 "Fantasy"  -  5:40 (Earl Johnson) (Solo by Bolin)
 "Sail On Sail Away"  -  4:52 (Earl Johnson) (Solo by Johnson)
 "Can't You See I'm a Star"  -  3:36 (Earl Johnson) (Solo by Johnson)
 "Moon Rider (Moonrider)" -   4:25 (Earl Johnson, Buzz Shearman) (Solo by Bolin)
 "Time to Move On"  -  4:09  (Earl Johnson, Buzz Shearman) (Solo by Bolin)
 "Still I Wonder"  -  4:16 (Earl Johnson) (Solo by Bolin)
 "Train"   -  4:37 (Earl Johnson, Robert Bonnell) (Solo by Bolin and Johnson)
 "Out of the Darkness"  - 4:57 (Earl Johnson, Buzz Shearman) (Solo by Bolin)

Single (1974) 

Single (Yorkville Records 1974) 
 "Can't You See I'm a Star" (Solo by Johnson)
 "Out of the Darkness"

Credits 
 Buzz Shearman - vocals
 Earl Johnson - guitar
 Terry Juric - bass
 Bill Wade - drums
 Tommy Bolin - guitar solos
 Tom Stephenson - piano in "Fantasy"
 Mark Smith - producer, engineer
 Richard Dashut - engineer
 Recorded and Mixed at Sound City, Van Nuys, California
 Jacket sleeve photo by Larry Nickels
 Arranged by Moxy
 Buddy Caine - guitar (Note: Buddy Caine is listed on the album cover, but did not join the band until after the album was finished.)

Reissued 
Moxy’s original catalogue of albums were again available starting in 1994 when Valerie Shearman ("Buzz" widow) oversaw the release of all of Moxy's back catalogue of albums on CD through Pacemaker Records, and again in  2003 this time through Unidisc Music Inc.

References

External links 
  Moxy Official Web Site
 Moxy's official MySpace Page
 CD/Album Review Review of Moxy at VistaRecords.us
  Earl Johnson interview at Tommy Bolin Fan Page on Angelfire

1975 debut albums
Moxy (band) albums
Mercury Records albums
Albums recorded at Sound City Studios